Madalavarigudem is a village in Gannavaram mandal, located in Krishna district of the Indian state of Andhra Pradesh.

References

Villages in Krishna district